Javier Frana and Christo van Rensburg were the defending champions, but van Rensburg did not compete this year. Frana teamed up with Mark Petchey and lost in the quarterfinals to Paul Annacone and Doug Flach.

Alex Antonitsch and Greg Rusedski won the title by defeating Kent Kinnear and David Wheaton 6–4, 3–6, 6–4 in the final.

Seeds

Draw

Draw

References

External links
 Official results archive (ATP)
 Official results archive (ITF)

Hall of Fame Tennis Championships - Doubles
Hall of Fame Open